The Headies Award for Lyricist on the Roll is an award presented at The Headies, a ceremony that was established in 2006 and originally called the Hip Hop World Awards. It was first presented to Mode 9 in 2006, the category is one of six categories not open to public voting.

Recipients

Category records
Most wins

Most nominations

Notes

References

The Headies